Manju Warrier (born 10 September 1978) is an Indian actress, producer, classical dancer and playback singer who primarily appears in Malayalam language films. She is the recipient of several awards. She is regarded as one of the most prolific actresses in Malayalam cinema.

She made her acting debut in Sakshyam (1995) at the age of 17. Her notable films include Thooval Kottaram (1996), Sallapam (1996), Ee Puzhayum Kadannu (1996), and Aaraam Thampuran (1997).

Early life
Manju Warrier was born on 10 September 1978 in Nagercoil city of Kanyakumari district of Tamil Nadu in a Malayali family. Her family is originally from Pullu village in Thrissur district of Kerala. Her father, T. V. Madhavan, worked as an accountant at Shakthi Finance's Nagercoil regional office and her mother(from Thiruvilwamala) was a house wife. She has an elder brother, Madhu Wariar, who is also an actor and producer.

Warrier did her primary schooling from CSI Matriculation Higher Secondary School, Nagercoil. After her father was promoted, they returned to Kerala and settled in Kannur. She studied at Chinmaya Vidyalaya, Kannur and later at Chovva Higher Secondary School.

Career

Early films (1995–1999)
Warrier  first appeared in a television serial Moharavam which was telecast on Doordarshan.

In the first half of her on-screen career, Manju featured in 20 films over a three-year period in Malayalam.

At the age of 17, she debuted in the film Sakshyam (1995). Later at the age of 18, she acted in the movie Sallapam (1996), co-starring Dileep, whom she later married.

Her performance in the movie Kannezhuthi Pottum Thottu won a special mention from the jury for the National Film Awards. Her other films include: Kanmadam and Aaraam Thampuran with Mohanlal,   Ee Puzhayum Kadannu and Kudamattam with her now ex-husband Dileep, Summer in Bethlehem, Pranayavarnangal, Pathram and Kaliyattam with Suresh Gopi, and Irattakuttikalude Achan,Dilliwala Rajakumaran, Kaliveedu, Thooval Kottaram and Krishnagudiyil Oru Pranayakalathu with Jayaram.

She won the Kerala State Film Award for Best Actress for her performance in the movie Ee Puzhayum Kadannu. In Kanmadam, she portrayed the role of a high-tempered blacksmith named Bhanu, which also starred Mohanlal. Then she acted in the films Daya, and Pathram.Her last film before she took a sabbatical was Kannezhuthi Pottum Thottu.

Professional return and comeback to the movies (2012-2014)
On 24 October 2012, she performed Kuchipudi in the Guruvayur Sree Krishna Temple. Later in July 2013, she acted in a commercial with Amitabh Bachchan. She later appeared in many advertisements. She recently published a book titled Sallapam.

She made her return to cinema with Rosshan Andrrews's How Old Are You in 2014.

2015- present

Her next film was Sathyan Anthikad's Ennum Eppozhum which reunites her with Mohanlal after a gap of 17 years. Her next project was Rani Padmini by Aashiq Abu along with Rima Kallingal, released in October 2015. The film did not fare well at the box office. She acted in Jo and the Boy, Vettah, Karinkunnam 6's C/O Saira Banu,  Udaharanam Sujatha and  Villain.

She acted in a Sanskrit stage drama based on Abhijñānaśākuntalam. The play was presented by the Sopanam Institute of Performing Arts & Research, founded by the late Kavalam Narayana Panicker, and was hosted by Swaralaya. Warrier debuted as a producer as well and the play was produced under her banner, Manju Warrier Productions.

In 2018, Manju appeared in the lead role in the Kamala Surayya biopic Aami. Her next film for release was the musical-romantic-comedy drama Mohanlal - a Malayalam film, in which she played a die-hard fan of Mohanlal.

Her next release was the much-hyped fantasy drama Odiyan.

Her first release in 2019 was Lucifer directed by Prithviraj Sukumaran.

In 2019, she made her Tamil debut with Vetrimaaran's Asuran opposite Dhanush.In March 2021, Warrier began filming for Amriki Pandit, her Hindi debut opposite R. Madhavan. In 2022, Manju reunited with Biju Menon through Lalitham Sundaram after a gap of 20 years.

Personal life
On 20 October 1998, Manju married actor Dileep at the Aluva Sri Krishna Temple. The couple have a daughter, Meenakshi. They filed for divorce in 2014 and it was granted in January 2015. Her autobiography Sallapam (Memories) was released in November 2014. Manju lives in Thrissur, Kerala.

In the media
Her characters appear on many lists featuring strong women characters in Indian Cinema.

Manju Warrier is also a professional Kuchipudi dancer, having learnt the art from Geetha Padmakumar. She actively performs in many classical dance programs and plays. Her return to stage at Guruvayur as part of the Navaratri dance festival. She received the Kerala Sangeetha Nataka Akademi Award in 2014 and was the first person to receive the award for Kuchipudi.

Apart from films, she also acts in television commercials and is a brand ambassador of Lasagu Coaching App, Kalyan Jewellers, Sony India.

Filmography

As actress 
 All films are in Malayalam language unless otherwise noted.

As voice actor

Discography

Awards and nominations

Notes

References

External links 

 
 
 

1978 births
Living people
20th-century Indian actresses
21st-century Indian actresses
Actresses from Kerala
Actresses from Tamil Nadu
Actresses from Thrissur
Actresses in Malayalam cinema
Filmfare Awards South winners
Indian film actresses
Kerala State Film Award winners
People from Nagercoil
Actresses in Tamil cinema
Actresses in Malayalam television
Special Mention (feature film) National Film Award winners
People from Kanyakumari district
Malayali people
Recipients of the Kerala Sangeetha Nataka Akademi Award